Aschner is a surname. Notable people with the surname include:

 Ilse Maria Aschner (1918–2012), Austrian journalist and survivor of the Holocaust
 Manfred Aschner (1901–1989), German-born Israeli microbiologist and entomologist
 Marilyn Aschner (born 1948), American professional tennis player
 Milivoj Ašner (1913–2011), Croatian police chief

See also 
 Asner